James Vincent R. Martinez (born January 31, 1987) is a Filipino professional basketball player for the Bicol Spicy Oragons of the Pilipinas Super League.

Career

Philippine Basketball Association
He was drafted with the 18th overall pick by the Barangay Ginebra Kings in the 2011 PBA Draft and was later signed by the Powerade Tigers before the start of the upcoming season that time. During his short tenure in the PBA, he played both the point guard and the shooting guard positions. He played a season with the Powerade Tigers on the 2011–12 PBA season. On July 30, 2012, Coca-Cola Bottlers Philippines, Inc. announced that their PBA team, the Powerade Tigers, was sold to Sultan 900, Inc. which is owned and represented by its chairman and CEO Michael Romero. The Board of Governors unanimously approved the purchase on a special board meeting on August 17.

PBA D-League and MPBL
After his PBA stint, Martinez played for AMA Online Education of the PBA D-League in 2016. He debuted at the Maharlika Pilipinas Basketball League with the Bulacan Kuyas in February 2018.

References

1987 births
Living people
Filipino men's basketball players
Point guards
Powerade Tigers players
Shooting guards
UE Red Warriors basketball players
Maharlika Pilipinas Basketball League players
Barangay Ginebra San Miguel draft picks
Filipino expatriate basketball people in Thailand